John Steer may refer to:

John Steer (merchant) (1824–1918), English-born Canadian merchant and politician
John Steer (politician) (1919–1968), Australian politician
John Steer (art historian) (1928–2012), English art historian

See also
John Steere